Henry Fulton (1761 – 17 November 1840) was a Church of Ireland curate who, as a United Irishman in 1798, was transported to New South Wales where in the Rum Rebellion, and the subsequent inquiries, he took the part of Governor William Bligh.


Early life
Fulton was born in Lisburn, County Antrim, in the Kingdom of Ireland in 1761 and educated at Trinity College, Dublin from 1788, graduating B.A. in 1792. As a student he met Theobald Wolfe Tone and, committed to Catholic Emancipation and reform, followed him into the Society of United Irishmen. He became the Church of Ireland curate in Silvermines, and vicar of Nenagh in County Tipperary, while remaining active in the now republican cause.  He spied for the United Irishmen, carried messages and swore in new members. During the rebellion of 1798 he was chased by the Yeomanry from Nenagh to Newport, caught and imprisoned in Limerick.

After two years, he was sentenced to penal transportation to New South Wales. The bishop of Derry, in a letter to the archbishop of Canterbury written in August 1807, incorrectly stated that Fulton "agreed to transport himself for life to Botany Bay", as had seven of seventy-three political prisoners sailing on the Minerva with him.

New South Wales
Fulton left Ireland with his wife and son on 24 August 1799, and shared the same cabin with Joseph Holt. They arrived at Sydney on 11 January 1800. Fulton was conditionally emancipated in November, and began to conduct services at the Hawkesbury on 7 December. In February 1801 he was sent to Norfolk Island to act as chaplain, in December 1805 he received a full pardon from Governor King, and in 1806 he returned to Sydney to take up the duties of Samuel Marsden who had been given leave of absence. At the time of the revolt against William Bligh, Fulton stood by him and, showing no disposition to yield to the officers, was suspended from his office as chaplain. On 18 May 1808 he wrote to Bligh testifying to his justice and impartiality, and in April and July 1808 and on 14 February 1809 and 23 March 1809, he wrote letters to Viscount Castlereagh giving accounts of what had happened and severely censuring the conduct of the officers. Immediately after the arrival of Governor Macquarie Fulton was reinstated as assistant chaplain. He went to England as a witness at the court martial of Colonel Johnston, and returned to Sydney in 1812.

In 1814 Fulton was appointed chaplain at Castlereagh, New South Wales and was made a magistrate. He also established a school and had for a pupil Charles Tompson who dedicated his volume Wild Notes from the Lyre of a Native Minstrel to Fulton. This was the first volume of verse written by a native-born Australian and published in Australia. The first poem in the book "Retrospect" has complimentary references to Fulton, as a teacher and as a man. In 1833 Fulton was still chaplain at Castlereagh, and in that year published a pamphlet of some forty pages entitled Strictures Upon a Letter Lately Written by Roger Therry, Esquire, and in 1836 his name appears as a member of a sub-committee at Penrith formed to work against the introduction of the system of national education then established in Ireland.

Legacy
Fulton died at the parsonage, Castlereagh, on 17 November 1840.
Fulton lost his living in Ireland on account of his sympathy for the Irish, and in Australia again went against his own interests in supporting Bligh. He was married and had one son and three daughters. His wife predeceased him by four years.

References

1761 births
1840 deaths
United Irishmen
Australian educators
Australian people of Irish descent
Convicts transported to Australia